Winoa, headquartered in France, specializes in the preparation, treatment and transformation of metal surfaces, the manufacture of steel shot and grit, stainless steel abrasives and cut-wire, technological tools and services, as well as the production of steel grit used for cutting stone.

History 
The company was founded in 1961 through a joint venture between a subsidiary of the French group Wendel and the US Wheelabrator corporation. The company took the name WINOA on its 50th anniversary in 2011.

In the 1980s, the group underwent development following acquisitions in the UK, Italy, Canada and the United States. This development continued into the 1990s in the Czech Republic, Spain, Austria, Slovenia, South Africa, Brazil and Asia (China, Korea, Thailand and Japan).

In 2005, Winoa was acquired by LBO France.

In 2014, the investment firm KKR acquired the company after it had suffered from the 2009 economic crisis, as business in its primary markets (the automotive, steel and construction industries) had slowed significantly. The group, subsequently restructured, set its focus on three regions: Russia, India, and Southeast Asia.

On March 21, 2017, after three years of debt restructuring, KPS Capital Partners LP became its majority shareholder. The company announced its intention to develop in China and India.

On February 23, 2021, Blackstone entered into an agreement to further invest in Winoa Group. Blackstone Credit has been part of the Winoa investors consortium since 2017.

Sites 
Winoa is headquartered in Le Cheylas (Isère), where it was founded. In addition to its French plant and its research and test centers, it has 9 manufacturing facilities located in Spain, Canada, South Korea, Japan, Slovenia, Brazil, Thailand, and Russia. 180 people work at Le Cheylas.

Notes and references 

Companies based in Auvergne-Rhône-Alpes
French brands
Abrasives